= 2020 Antrim Senior Football Championship =

Gaelic football competition

Tournament details
- County: Antrim
- Year: 2020
- Trophy: Padraig McNamee Cup
- Sponsor: Northern Switchgear
- Date: August – September 2020
- Teams: 12
- Defending champions: Erin's Own Cargin

Winners
- Champions: ???
- Manager: ???
- Captain: ???
- Qualify for: Ulster Club SFC

Runners-up
- Runners-up: ???
- Manager: ???
- Captain: ???

Promotion/Relegation
- Relegated team(s): ???

The 2020 Antrim Senior Football Championship is the 118th edition of the Antrim GAA's premier club Gaelic football tournament for senior graded teams in County Antrim, Northern Ireland. The tournament consists of 13 teams, with the winner going on to represent Antrim in the Ulster Senior Club Football Championship. The championship changed its format this year. Formerly straight knockout, it now starts with a group stage and then progresses to a knock out stage.

Erin's Own Cargin were the defending champions after they defeated the Lámh Dhearg after a replay in the previous years final.

This was St James' (2019 I.F.C. Champions) return to the senior grade after at 2 year absence (they were relegated from the S.F.C. to the I.F.C. back in 2017) when claiming the 2019 Antrim I.F.C. title with a final victory over St Ergnat's Moneyglass.

== Team changes ==
The following teams have changed division since the 2019 championship season.

=== To S.F.C. ===
Promoted from 2019 Antrim I.F.C.

- St James' Aldergrove - (Intermediate Champions)

=== From S.F.C. ===
Relegated to 2020 Antrim I.F.C.

- St Teresa's

== Group stage ==
There are 4 groups called Group A, B, C and D. The top two finishers in each group will qualify for the quarter-finals. The bottom finishers of each group will qualify for the Relegation Play Off. Each team plays each other on both a home and away basis, with the first team named at home.

=== Group A ===
Team	Pld	W	L	D	GF	GA	GD	Pts
Creggan Kickhams	4	3	1	0	52	34	+18	6
Roger Casement's Portglenone	4	2	2	0	56	51	+5	4
St Mary's Ahoghill	4	1	3	0	46	69	−23	2

- Ahoghill 0-15, 0-12 Portglenone, 26/7/2020,
- Portglenone 1-7, 1-10 Creggan, 29/7/2020,
- Creggan 1-10, 0-8 Ahoghill, 2/8/2020,
- Portglenone 4-13, 3-7 Ahoghill, 12/8/2020,
- Creggan 0-7, 1-6 Portglenone, 19/8/2020,
- Ahoghill 0-7, 1-16 Creggan, 26/8/2020,

=== Group B ===
Team	Pld	W	L	D	GF	GA	GD	Pts
Lámh Dhearg	4	3	1	0	61	48	+13	6
O'Donovan Rossa	4	1	1	2	52	53	−1	4
St John's	4	0	2	2	44	56	−12	2

- Lámh Dhearg 1-11, 0-11 St John's, 26/7/2020,
- St John's 1-8, 0-11 O'Donovan Rossa, 29/7/2020,
- O'Donovan Rossa 1-9, 2-9 Lámh Dhearg, 2/8/2020,
- St John's 0-9, 3-9 Lámh Dhearg, 12/8/2020,
- O'Donovan Rossa 1-10, 2-7 St John's, 19/8/2020,
- Lámh Dhearg 1-11, 0-16 O'Donovan Rossa, 26/8/2020,

=== Group C ===
Team	Pld	W	L	D	GF	GA	GD	Pts
Erin's Own Cargin	6	6	0	0	121	61	+60	12
St Mary's Aghagallon	6	3	3	0	111	89	+22	6
St Brigid's	6	2	4	0	84	128	−44	4
St James' Aldergrove	6	1	5	0	74	132	−58	2

- Aghagallon 1-13, 0-12 St Brigid's, 26/7/2020,
- St. James' 0-4, 3-14 Cargin, 26/7/2020,
- St Brigid's 1-17, 1-12 St James', 29/7/2020,
- Cargin 2-9, 0-12 Aghagallon, 29/7/2020,
- Aghagallon 6-12, 1-7 St James', 2/8/2020,
- Cargin 1-9, 1-6 St Brigid's, 2/8/2020,
- Cargin 2-18, 0-9 St James', 12/8/2020,
- St Brigid's 0-11, 3-14 Aghagallon, 12/8/2020,
- St James' 0-14, 3-13 St Brigid's, 19/8/2020,
- Aghagallon 3-8, 1-16 Cargin, 19/8/2020,
- St James' 1-19, 2-7 Aghagallon, 26/8/2020,
- St Brigid's 1-7, 3-19 Cargin, 26/6/2020,

=== Group D ===
Team	Pld	W	L	D	GF	GA	GD	Pts
St Gall's	4	3	1	0	45	34	+11	6
Naomh Éanna	4	3	1	0	37	35	+2	6
Gort na Móna	4	0	4	0	20	33	−13	0

- Gort na Móna were forced to concede their final two games, due to one of their players testing positive for COVID-19.

- Naomh Éanna 0-13, 2-4 Gort na Móna, 26/7/2020,
- Gort na Móna 1-7, 1-17 St Gall's, 29/7/2020,
- St Gall's 1-8, 1-10 Naomh Éanna, 2/8/2020,
- Gort na Móna scr, w/o Naomh Éanna, 12/8/2020,
- St Gall's w/o, scr Gort na Móna, 19/8/2020,
- Naomh Éanna 1-8, 1-11 St Gall's, 26/8/2020,

== Knock-out stage ==
=== Relegation play-offs ===
The four bottom finishers from each group qualify for the relegation play-offs. The team to lose both matches were relegated to the 2021 I.F.C.

?? September 2020; Relegation semi-final	???	-vs-	???	???

?? September 2020; Relegation semi-final	???	-vs-	???	???

?? September 2020; Relegation final	???	-vs-	???	???

== Quarter-finals ==
The winners and runners up of each group qualify for the quarter-finals.

30 August 2020; Quarter-final	Creggan Kickhams	-vs-	Naomh Éanna	Dunsilly

30 August 2020; Quarter-final	Lámh Dhearg	-vs-	St Mary's Aghagallon	Corrigan Park

1 September 2020; Quarter-final	Erin's Own Cargin	-vs-	O'Donovan Rossa	Ahoghill

1 September 2020; Quarter-final	Roger Casements Portglenone	-vs-	St Gall's	Corrigan Park

== Semi-finals ==
5 September 2020; Semi-final	???	-vs-	???	???

5 September 2020; Semi-final	???	-vs-	???	???

== Final ==
20 September 2020; Final	Erin's Own, Cargin	-vs-	Creggan Kickhams	???
